Felipe Guimarães Alves (born 18 November 1990), known as Felipe Alves, is a Brazilian footballer who plays as a forward for Uberlândia Esporte Clube.

Club career
Born in Flórida, Paraná, Felipe Alves appeared for Adap and Real Massamá during his youth. He made his senior debut for Red Bull Brasil in 2010, appearing in Copa Paulista, and the following year represented Penapolense in Campeonato Paulista Série A3.

On 19 December 2011, Felipe Alves signed a contract with Série B club Avaí. He made his professional debut on 19 May 2012, starting in a 2–2 away draw against Boa Esporte; his first goal in the category came on 2 June, netting the first in a 1–2 home loss against rivals Joinville.

After loan spells back at Penapolense, Matsumoto Yamaga FC and Santo André, Felipe Alves was released by Avaí in May 2014 and immediately joined Luverdense. In January 2015 he moved to Cuiabá, being crowned champions of both Copa Verde and Campeonato Matogrossense; he was also selected in the Team of the Year of the latter.

On 10 September 2015 Felipe Alves moved abroad, signing for Bahraini Premier League club Manama. In February 2016 he returned to his homeland, joining Juventus.

On 3 June 2016, Felipe Alves agreed to a contract with Portuguesa.

Honours

Club
Penapolense
Campeonato Paulista Série A3: 2011

Avaí
Campeonato Catarinense: 2012

Cuiabá
Campeonato Matogrossense: 2015
Copa Verde: 2015

Individual
Campeonato Matogrossense Team of the Year: 2015

References

External links

1990 births
Living people
Sportspeople from Paraná (state)
Brazilian footballers
Association football forwards
Red Bull Brasil players
Clube Atlético Penapolense players
Avaí FC players
Esporte Clube Santo André players
Luverdense Esporte Clube players
Cuiabá Esporte Clube players
Clube Atlético Juventus players
Associação Portuguesa de Desportos players
Matsumoto Yamaga FC players
Mogi Mirim Esporte Clube players
Ipatinga Futebol Clube players
União Recreativa dos Trabalhadores players
Boa Esporte Clube players
Grêmio Osasco Audax Esporte Clube players
Clube Atlético Patrocinense players
Joinville Esporte Clube players
Uberlândia Esporte Clube players
Campeonato Brasileiro Série B players
Campeonato Brasileiro Série C players
Campeonato Brasileiro Série D players
Bahraini Premier League players
J2 League players
Brazilian expatriate footballers
Brazilian expatriate sportspeople in Japan
Brazilian expatriate sportspeople in Bahrain
Expatriate footballers in Japan
Expatriate footballers in Bahrain